The Battle of Erbach was a battle of the French Revolutionary Wars fought on May 15, 1800. The forces of the French Consulate, led by Sainte-Suzanne. The Habsburg forces were led by Baron Pál Kray. The French had 15,000 soldiers, while the Austrians had 36,000 soldiers, including 12,000 cavalry. The Austrians attacked vigorously but could not rout the French forces. The French hold to their main positions for 12 hours, until the approach of St Cyr's corps forced the Austrians to retire. Both sides suffered heavy casualties.

References
George Bruce. Harbottle's Dictionary of Battles. (Van Nostrand Reinhold, 1981).

Conflicts in 1800
Battles involving Austria
Battles involving France
Battles of the French Revolutionary Wars
1800 in Austria
1800 in France
1800 in the Holy Roman Empire